Weinberg  is a German television miniseries that aired on TNT Serie in 2015. It was among the 2016 Grimme-Preis winners for television.

See also
List of German television series

References

External links
 

2015 German television series debuts
2015 German television series endings
German-language television shows
TNT Serie original programming
Grimme-Preis for fiction winners